Ante Tomić may refer to:
Ante Tomić (writer) (born 1970), Croatian writer
Ante Tomić (basketball) (born 1987), Croatian basketball player
Ante Tomić (footballer) (born 1983), Croatian football player